Transverse scapular ligament may refer to:

 Superior transverse scapular ligament
 Inferior transverse ligament of scapula